Miss Colombia 1993, the 59th Miss Colombia pageant, was held in the Centro de Convenciones Cartagena de Indias, located in Cartagena de Indias, Bolívar Department, Colombia.

Results

Placements

Special awards
 Most Beautiful Hair-  Valle Diana Isabel Romero
 Reina de la policia -  Meta Norma Herrera Leal
 Best Regional Costume -  Valle Diana Isabel Romero 
 Miss Congeniality -  Cesar Cecilia Fernández Angarita

Delegates

30 delegates were selected to compete.

References

External links
Official site

Miss Colombia
1993 in Colombia
1993 beauty pageants